Nakdonggang station is a railway station on the Gyeongjeon Line in South Korea. It is well known among the locals as a place where one will find true love.

Railway stations in South Gyeongsang Province